Lou From Paradise is an American rapper from Staten Island, New York. Lou gained some popularity in the underground hip hop scene with his debut mixtape Humaniac (2017), and has often been compared to golden age hip hop rappers. Detroit rapper Eminem has been cited as a major influence to Lou.

Discography 

Humaniac (2017)
Painkiller Paradise (2019)
  Not Dead yet! (2021)

References 

Rappers from New York (state)
Horrorcore artists
Living people
1995 births